The United Arab Emirates national cricket team is the team that represents the United Arab Emirates in international cricket. They are governed by the Emirates Cricket Board (ECB) which became an Affiliate Member of the International Cricket Council (ICC) in 1989 and an Associate Member the following year. Since 2005, the ICC's headquarters have been located in Dubai.

One of the emerging One Day International (ODI) teams, the UAE won the ACC Trophy on four consecutive occasions between 2000 and 2006, and were runners-up in the other three times the tournament has been played in 1996, 1998 and 2008. They won the ICC Trophy in 1994, and played their first ODIs that year, later playing in the 1996 Cricket World Cup. Other ODI matches came in the 2004 and 2008 Asia Cups. At the 2014 World Cup Qualifier, the UAE placed second behind Scotland, qualifying for the 2015 World Cup and gaining ODI status until 2018.

UAE made the group stage of the 2014 ICC World Twenty20. The team has qualified for the 2019 ICC T20 World Cup Qualifier as hosts. Following the demise of the World Cricket League (WCL), UAE will play in the 2019–22 ICC Cricket World Cup League 2 going forward.

History

Early days
In 1892,
cricket was introduced by the British Army in what is now the UAE, but was then known as the "Trucial States". The game spread during World War II, as personnel from the British Royal Air Force and other Commonwealth forces (which included first-class and club cricketers from Australia and New Zealand) stationed in cities such as Ajman, Al Ain, Dubai and Sharjah, continued their favourite pastime. The pitches installed by them around the air base in Sharjah were used by British and other foreign nationals after the war ended.

Sharjah residents began playing the Dubai residents in the local derbies which were held in Dubai. The Garden city of Al Ain has the oldest cricket council in the whole of the UAE. The popularity of the game declined after independence in 1971; however, when South Asians began settling in the country, they brought with them a wish to play cricket. The local Arab population, educated in India and Pakistan, set up clubs and domestic tournaments began in the 1980s.

Making of the national side
The first match was played by the UAE national side in February 1976 against Pakistan International Airlines in Sharjah. The visitors scored 345/5 from their 50 overs and the UAE were on 88/4 from 28 overs when the game was abandoned due to rain.

Wealthy locals began investing in the sport and an International standard cricket ground was constructed in Sharjah. The Sharjah Cricket Association Stadium hosted its first international event in 1984 when India, Pakistan and Sri Lanka contested the Asia Cup. The venue has gone on to host almost 200 ODIs and four Test matches, the Test matches having been held there due to security concerns in Pakistan.

The Emirates Cricket Board (ECB) was established in 1989 and gained affiliate membership of the ICC the same year. They were quickly promoted to associate member status the following year. Also in 1990 the national side returned to action, twice losing heavily to the Netherlands. These heavy defeats showed that much work needed to be done if the UAE were to be successful in the 1994 ICC Trophy and the ECB adopted a controversial policy.

1994 ICC Trophy
Hoping to form a successful national side in time for the tournament in Kenya, the ECB attracted several players with first-class experience in India, Pakistan and Sri Lanka to take up employment in the country so that they could satisfy the residential requirements to represent the UAE in the tournament.

With just one native Arab selected in the shape of Sultan Zarawani, who captained the side, the UAE won the trophy and thus qualified for the 1996 World Cup. UAE had beaten Kenya in the final, and the Kenyan players and cricket board were very vocal in their anger at being defeated by what they and other observers described as a team of imported mercenaries.

Whilst the ICC remained relatively silent on the controversy, the national team eligibility requirements were strongly tightened for all future ICC sanctioned tournaments.

First ODIs
The UAE played their first ODIs in 1994 when they played against India and Pakistan in the Austral-Asia Cup, which they also hosted. They finished last in a tri-series against Kenya and the Netherlands the same year and also finished last in a tournament against the A sides of India, Pakistan and Sri Lanka in 1995. They returned to ODI cricket in the 1996 World Cup where they lost all matches except the one against the Netherlands, which was the first ever ODI between two associate members of the ICC.

Later in 1996 the UAE were runners-up to Bangladesh in the first ACC Trophy. The tightened eligibility rules meant that they were unable to repeat their 1994 success when they finished tenth in the 1997 ICC Trophy in Malaysia. They were beaten by Bangladesh in the semi-finals of the 1998 ACC Trophy.

21st century

2000 – 2009

With Bangladesh being promoted to ICC full membership, the UAE began to establish themselves as the top associate side in Asia, though they often fell short against the top associates in Europe and North America, a position that remains to this day. They won the ACC Trophy in 2000 and 2002, beating Hong Kong and Nepal in the respective finals, but finished fifth in the 2001 ICC Trophy in Canada.

UAE hosted the 2004 ICC Six Nations Challenge and finished fifth, level on points with four other teams. The year was a busy one for the UAE cricketers as they played the first Intercontinental Cup match against Nepal, with Ali Asad taking nine wickets in the first innings. They beat Malaysia later in the tournament but lost to Canada in the semi-finals. They also won the ACC Trophy again, beating Oman in the final. They returned to ODI cricket, losing to India and Sri Lanka in the first round of the Asia Cup, and finished fourth in the Hong Kong Sixes, beating India and South Africa on the way.

They reached the semi-finals of the ICC Intercontinental Cup again in 2005, also playing a series against England A at Sharjah, losing all four matches. The 2005 ICC Trophy in Ireland saw them finish sixth. They beat Hong Kong in the final of the 2006 ACC Trophy, but began their 2006 ICC Intercontinental Cup campaign with an innings defeat by Namibia. The campaign continued with a draw against Scotland and a defeat by Ireland, again by an innings. They finished fourth in the first ACC Twenty20 Cup in 2007.

Their campaign in the 2007-08 ICC Intercontinental Cup was unsuccessful, with just one win against Bermuda in their seven matches. Things went better for them in Division Two of the World Cricket League in Windhoek in 2007, winning the tournament after beating Oman in the final.

They again played in the Asia Cup in 2008, losing to Bangladesh and Sri Lanka in the first round. Their 2008 ACC Trophy Elite began with a shock defeat by Saudi Arabia, their first ACC Trophy defeat since the 1998 semi-final. They lost to Hong Kong in the final, ending a run of four consecutive titles.

The UAE hosted and were runners-up at the 2009 ACC Twenty20 Cup, losing the final to Afghanistan, after winning four group matches and accounting for Oman in their semi-final.

2010 – present

In October 2010, the team announced that it had hired Kabir Khan to become its coach. Khan had great success with the Afghan team during his one-year stint as they became eligible to play ODIs. Kabir Khan also stated that his aim was to help UAE qualify for the 2012 ICC World Twenty20.

In April 2011, the UAE hosted and won Division Two of the World Cricket League without losing a match. In June/July 2011, they played Kenya at Nairobi for the first round of 2011–13 ICC Intercontinental Cup. In December, the UAE participated in the 2011 ACC Twenty20 Cup in Nepal. Then in 2013, they traveled to Scotland to compete in the 2013 Cricket World Cup Qualifier, the final event of the 2009–13 World Cricket League.

UAE finished third in the 2013 ACC Twenty20 Cup which after defeating Hong Kong in the play-off for third place. In November, they hosted 2013 ICC World Twenty20 Qualifier and finished fourth after losing to Nepal in the play-off for third place, and qualified for the 2014 ICC World Twenty20, defeating the Netherlands by 10 runs in the quarter-final.

UAE participated in the 2014 ICC World Twenty20 but were unsuccessful in the tournament, going without a win. UAE finished second in the 2014 ACC Premier League and qualified for the 2014 ACC Championship. They also qualified for 2015 Cricket World Cup in Australia and New Zealand.

UAE qualified to play in the Cricket World Cup after a lapse of almost twenty years. Unlike other teams in the tournament, the squad of players mainly consisted of semi-professionals. The team registered their highest ODI total ever at the 2015 Cricket World Cup in a group stage match played against Zimbabwe in Nelson, New Zealand. However, they failed to register a win and were eliminated from the 2015 Cricket World Cup with 6 losses out of 6 matches in Pool B.

Current squad
This lists all the players who have played for United Arab Emirates in the past 12 months or has been part of the latest ODI or T20I squad. 

Updated as of 21 February 2023.

International grounds

Updated 3 November 2016

Infrastructure
In terms of infrastructure, the UAE have the best stadiums as compared to other Associate members: Sheikh Zayed Cricket Stadium in Abu Dhabi;
DSC Cricket Stadium, Dubai and Sharjah Cricket Association Stadium, Sharjah, which has hosted around 200 ODIs and Test matches.

International stadiums in Ajman and Al Ain are currently under development.

The following are the main cricket stadiums in UAE:
 Sharjah Cricket Association Stadium, Sharjah
 DSC Cricket Stadium, Dubai
 Sheikh Zayed Cricket Stadium, Abu Dhabi
 Dubai Cricket Council Ground No 1, Dubai
 Dubai Cricket Council Ground No 2, Dubai
 ICC Global Cricket Academy 1, Dubai
 ICC Global Cricket Academy 2, Dubai
 Ajman International Cricket Stadium (under construction), Ajman
 Al Ain International Cricket Stadium (under construction), Al Ain

Tournament history

World Cup

ICC T20 World Cup

ICC World Cup Qualifier

 1979 to 1986: Not eligible – Not an ICC member
 1990: Did not participate
 1994: Winners
 1997: 10th place
 2001: 5th place
 2005: 6th place
 2009: 7th place
2014: Runner up (Qualified for 2015 Cricket World Cup)
2018: 6th place
 2023: TBD

ICC T20 World Cup Qualifier

 2010: 3rd Place
 2013: 4th Place
 2015: 13th Place
 2019: 8th Place
 2022 (A): Champions

Intercontinental Cup

 2004: Semi Finals
 2005: Semi Finals
 2006: First round
 2009–10 (Shield): 2nd place
 2011–13: 4th place

World Cricket League

2007 Division Two: Champions
2009 World Cup Qualifier: 7th place
2011 Division Two: Champions
2011–13 WCL Championship: 3rd place
2018 Division Two: Champions

Asia Cup

 1983 to 1988: Not eligible – Not an ACC member
 1990/91: Did not participate
 1995: Did not participate
 1997: Did not qualify
 2000: Did not qualify
 2004: First round
 2008: First round
 2010: Did not qualify
 2012: Did not qualify
 2014: Did not qualify
 2016: First round, 5th place
 2018: Did not qualify
 2022: Did not qualify

Asia Cup Qualifier 
2016: Winners (Qualified for 2016 Asia Cup)
2018: Runner up (failed to qualify)
2022: Runner up (failed to qualify)

ACC Western Region T20

 2019: Did not participate
 2020: Winner (Qualified for 2020 Asia Cup Qualifier)

ACC Championship

2014: Qualified

ACC Fast Track Countries Tournament

2004: Runners-up
2005: Winners
2006: Runners-up

ACC Premier League
2014: Runners-up

ACC Trophy
 1996: Runners up
 1998: Semi Finals
 2000: Winners
 2002: Winners
 2004: Winners
 2006: Winners
 2008 (Elite): Runners up
 2010 (Elite): 6th place
 2012: Winners (Shared trophy with Nepal)

ACC Twenty20 Cup
 2007: 4th place
 2009: Runners-up
 2011: 5th place
 2013: 3rd place

Coaching staff

Doctor :                                      Dr Abhijeet Salvi

Records and statistics

International match summary – United Arab Emirates

Last updated 16 March 2023.

One-Day Internationals
 Highest team total: 348/3 v. Namibia on 12 March 2022 at Sharjah Cricket Stadium, Sharjah
 Highest individual score: 132*, Khurram Khan v. Afghanistan on 30 November 2014 at ICC Academy 1, Dubai
 Best individual bowling figures: 6/34, Zahoor Khan v. Ireland on 2 March 2017 at ICC Academy 1, Dubai

Most ODI runs for the United Arab Emirates

Most ODI wickets for the United Arab Emirates

ODI record versus other nations

Records complete to ODI #4537. Last updated 16 March 2023.

Twenty20 Internationals
 Highest team total: 199/5 v. Kuwait on 27 February 2020 at Oman Cricket Academy Ground Turf 1, Muscat
 Highest individual score: 117*, Shaiman Anwar v. Papua New Guinea on 14 April 2017 at Sheikh Zayed Stadium, Abu Dhabi
 Best individual bowling figures: 5/19, Ahmed Raza v. Nepal on 22 February 2022 at Oman Cricket Academy Ground Turf 1, Muscat

Most T20I runs for the United Arab Emirates

Most T20I wickets for the United Arab Emirates

T20I record versus other nations

Records complete to T20I #1995. Last updated 19 February 2023.

Other First-class Records

ICC Trophy
 Highest team total: 330/9 v. Bermuda, 27 February 1994 at Nairobi Club Ground
 Highest individual score: 126 not out by Azhar Saeed, 25 February 1994 at Aga Khan Sports Club Ground, Nairobi
 Best innings bowling: 5/32 by Ahmed Nadeem v. USA, 1 July 2005 at The Meadow, Downpatrick

Overall
 Highest team total: 459/4 v. Brunei, 14 August 2006 at Kinrara Academy Oval, Kuala Lumpur
 Highest individual score: 213 not out by Arshad Ali v. Brunei, 14 August 2006 at Kinrara Academy Oval, Kuala Lumpur
 Best innings bowling: 9/74 by Ali Asad v. Nepal, 25 March 2004 at Sharjah Cricket Association Stadium

World records
 Highest ever partnership for 7th wicket in World Cup history (Amjad Javed and Shaiman Anwar 107 v. Ireland, Amjad Javed and Nasir Aziz 107 v. West Indies). UAE became the first team to score 100+ run stand for the 7th wicket in World Cup history. Thus, Amjad Javed is the only player in World Cup history to involve in two 100+ run stands for the seventh wicket.
 Khurram Khan is the oldest player to score an ODI century as well as the oldest player to score his maiden ODI century (at the age of 43 years and 162 days).

See also
 List of United Arab Emirates ODI cricketers
 List of United Arab Emirates Twenty20 International cricketers
 United Arab Emirates national women's cricket team

References

External links
 Emirates Cricket Board (Official website)
 International League T20 (Official website)

Cricket in the United Arab Emirates
National cricket teams
Cricket
United Arab Emirates in international cricket